Albert Hendrik "Benk" Korthals (born 5 October 1944) is a retired Dutch politician of the People's Party for Freedom and Democracy (VVD) and jurist. 

Korthals attended the Gymnasium Leiden from June 1957 until June 1963 and applied at the Leiden University in June 1967 majoring in law and obtaining a Bachelor of Laws degree before graduating with a Master of Laws degree in July 1973. Korthals worked as a lawyer and prosecutor in Rotterdam from January 1974 until August 1998. Korthals was elected as a Member of the House of Representatives after the election of 1982, taking office on 16 September 1982. After the election of 1998 Korthals was appointed as Minister of Justice in the Cabinet Kok II, taking office on 3 August 1998. After the election of 2002 Korthals returned as a Member of the House of Representatives, taking office on 23 May 2002. Following the cabinet formation of 2002 Korthals was appointment as Minister of Defence in the Cabinet Balkenende I, taking office on 22 July 2002. On 12 December 2002 Korthals resigned following the conclusions of a parliamentary inquiry report into a construction fraud investigation that was mishandled by him while serving as Minister of Justice. Korthals also served as Chairman of the People's Party for Freedom and Democracy from 22 May 2011 until 14 June 2014.

Decorations

References

External links

Official
  Mr. A.H. (Benk) Korthals Parlement & Politiek

1944 births
Living people
Dutch prosecutors
Chairmen of the People's Party for Freedom and Democracy
Leiden University alumni
Members of the House of Representatives (Netherlands)
Ministers of Defence of the Netherlands
Ministers of Justice of the Netherlands
Knights of the Order of the Netherlands Lion
Officers of the Order of Orange-Nassau
Politicians from Rotterdam
People from Voorschoten
People's Party for Freedom and Democracy politicians
Royal Netherlands Navy officers
20th-century Dutch lawyers
20th-century Dutch politicians
21st-century Dutch lawyers
21st-century Dutch politicians